Joseph Trumbull (March 11, 1737 – July 23, 1778), son of Governor Jonathan Trumbull of Connecticut, was the first commissary general of the Continental Army during the American Revolutionary War.

Biography
Trumbull was born in Lebanon, Connecticut. He graduated from Harvard in 1756, the same year his brother, artist John Trumbull, was born, and worked in his father's mercantile business. He served in the Connecticut House of Representatives from 1767 to 1773. He joined the Connecticut Committee of Correspondence at the outset of the American Revolution. He was elected as an alternate delegate to the First Continental Congress in 1774, but did not attend any sessions.

After Lexington and Concord in April 1775, the Connecticut Assembly appointed Trumbull as commissary general in charge of supplying food for the Connecticut troops who had joined the siege of Boston. At Boston, General George Washington was impressed with Trumbull's efforts, and recommended him for the same job in the newly created Continental Army. On 19 July 1775, Congress appointed Trumbull as Commissary General of Stores and Provisions, with the rank of colonel.

Trumbull struggled to meet the needs of the army, and was strongly criticized by some congressmen. He got into a dispute with General Philip Schuyler, who wanted to appoint his nephew Walter Livingston as commissary for Schuyler's Northern Department. Trumbull was charged with corruption but an official inquiry cleared him of wrongdoing in December 1775. Trumbull resigned in 1777 when Congress took away some of his duties.

Congress then appointed him to the Board of War, and he served from August 1777 until his resignation in April 1778 due to sickness. He died three months later in Lebanon and was buried in the East Cemetery.

See also
 Trumbull, Connecticut
 Trumbull County, Ohio

Notes

References

Purcell, L. Edward. Who Was Who in the American Revolution. New York: Facts on File, 1993. .
Risch, Erna. Supplying Washington's Army. Washington, D.C.: Center of Military History, U.S. Army, 1981. "Chapter 6: Organization of the Commissariat".

External links
Trumbull biography on U.S. Congress website

1737 births
1778 deaths
Continental Army officers from Connecticut
American people of English descent
Continental Army staff officers
Harvard University alumni
Members of the Connecticut House of Representatives
Military personnel from Connecticut
18th-century American politicians